John Leftwich may refer to:
 John W. Leftwich (1826–1870), U.S. Representative from Tennessee
 John T. Leftwich, geologist